The 1977 Kansas State Wildcats football team represented Kansas State University in the 1977 NCAA Division I football season.  The team's head football coach was Ellis Rainsberger.  1977 would turn out to be the last season with Rainsberger at the helm, as he was replaced with Jim Dickey in 1978.  The Wildcats played their home games in KSU Stadium.  1977 saw the Wildcats finish with a record of 2–9, and a dismal 0–7 record in Big Eight Conference play.

Schedule

^ Mississippi State was forced to forfeit the game.  The score of the game was 24–21, in favor of Mississippi State.

Roster

References

Kansas State
Kansas State Wildcats football seasons
Kansas State Wildcats football